Jaylen Bond (born April 11, 1993) is an American professional basketball player who last played for the Blackwater Bossing of the Philippine Basketball Association (PBA). He played college basketball for Texas and Temple.

High school career
Bond attended Plymouth-Whitemarsh High School.  He was named Associated Press Class AAAA player of the year as a senior. He averaged 19.0 points and 11.2 rebounds per game and led the team to a 25–6 record and the Pennsylvania Class 4A state semifinals. In his career, he scored 1,608 points.

College career
Bond averaged 3.4 points and 4.6 rebounds per game as a freshman at Texas. His scoring and rebounding dropped to 2.8 points and 3.2 rebounds per game as a sophomore as he battled ankle and foot injuries. Bond transferred from Texas to Temple in May 2013. He had two points and five rebounds in his first game as an Owl, a loss to Duke on November 21, 2014. Bond posted 7.6 points, 7.9 rebounds and 1.4 steals per game as a junior. He was named to the American Athletic Conference all-tournament team as a senior after posting 17 points and 10 rebounds in the semifinal loss to Connecticut. Bond tallied 11 double-doubles as a senior. He contributed 14 points and 15 rebounds in his final game, a 72–70 overtime loss to Iowa in the NCAA Tournament. As a senior at Temple, Bond averaged 10.3 points and 8.5 rebounds per game.

Professional career
After graduation, Bond joined the Westchester Knicks of the NBA D-League. In his rookie season, he averaged 7.5 points, 6.3 rebounds and 1.3 assists per game. 

In September 2017, he signed a one-year contract with the Italian team Pistoia Basket 2000. He averaged 6.6 points and 6.6 rebounds per game. In 2018, Bond signed with Al Nasr in the United Arab Emirates, helping the team win the regular season. He re-signed with the team in 2019.

On August 1, 2020, Bond signed with Al-Muharraq in Bahrain.

In November 2021, Bond signed with Blackwater Bossing of the Philippine Basketball Association.

References

External links
 Temple Owls bio

1993 births
Living people
American expatriate basketball people in Bahrain
American expatriate basketball people in Italy
American expatriate basketball people in the Philippines
American expatriate basketball people in the United Arab Emirates
American men's basketball players
Basketball players from Pennsylvania
Blackwater Bossing players
Lega Basket Serie A players
People from Norristown, Pennsylvania
Philippine Basketball Association imports
Power forwards (basketball)
Sportspeople from Montgomery County, Pennsylvania
Temple Owls men's basketball players
Texas Longhorns men's basketball players
Westchester Knicks players